Hooked on Winning is a 1982 album by the Maddy Prior band.

Subsequent to its original release on vinyl on [[Kempire Records KMPA001 and then Plant Life]], the album was unavailable for many years, until its 2011 re-release on CD on the Park Records label as part of a two album set with follow-up Going for Glory.

Track listing
Long Holiday [3:45] (Rick Kemp)
Information Station [3:45] (Maddy Prior)
Face To Face [4:09] (Maddy Prior)
Roll On The Day [4:24] (Rick Kemp)
Back Into Cabaret [3:18] (Rick Kemp)
Commit The Crime [3:35] (Maddy Prior)
Friends [4:18] (Rick Kemp)
Reduced Circumstances [4:05] (Maddy Prior)
Nothing But The Best [3:50] (Rick Kemp)
Love's Not Just A Word [3:32] (Rick Kemp)
Girls On The Town [4:03] (Maddy Prior / John o'Connor)
Anthem To Failure [3:45] (Maddy Prior)

Personnel

Maddy Prior - vocals
Richie Close - keyboards
Mick Dyche - guitar and vocals
Gary Wilson - drums and vocals
Rick Kemp - bass and vocals

References

1982 albums
Maddy Prior albums